Corbières may refer to:

Corbières, Aude, Aude department, France
Corbières, Gruyère, a municipality in Switzerland
Corbières AOC, a French wine appellation
Corbières Massif, a mountain region in the Languedoc-Roussillon in France
Corbières-en-Provence, Alpes-de-Haute-Provence department, France

See also 
 
 Canton of Les Corbières
 Canton of Les Corbières Méditerranée
 Corbière (disambiguation)